Rizvan Sarutdinoviç Umarov (born 5 April 1993) is a professional footballer who plays as a centre forward for Rotor Volgograd.

Born in Russia, he represented Azerbaijan at international level.

Club career
Born in Stavropol, Russia, Umarov has played club football in Russia and Spain for SDYuSShOR Zenit, Castellón, Elche Ilicitano, Anzhi and Dynamo Saint Petersburg.

On 30 June 2014, Umarov signed with Russian Football National League club Dynamo Saint Petersburg.

On 18 February 2016, Umarov signed with Meistriliiga club JK Narva Trans.

International career
He made his international debut for Azerbaijan in 2012.

Personal life
He also holds Russian citizenship.

References

1993 births
Living people
Russian footballers
Azerbaijani footballers
Azerbaijan international footballers
FC Zenit Saint Petersburg players
CD Castellón footballers
Elche CF Ilicitano footballers
FC Anzhi Makhachkala players
FC Dynamo Saint Petersburg players
FC SKA-Khabarovsk players
JK Narva Trans players
FC Neftekhimik Nizhnekamsk players
FC Leningradets Leningrad Oblast players
FC Rotor Volgograd players
Meistriliiga players
Association football forwards
Azerbaijani expatriate footballers
Azerbaijani expatriate sportspeople in Spain
Expatriate footballers in Spain
Azerbaijani expatriate sportspeople in Estonia
Expatriate footballers in Estonia
Russian expatriate sportspeople in Estonia
Russian expatriate sportspeople in Spain
Russian expatriate footballers
Sportspeople from Stavropol